The following are the basketball events that are expected to take place in 2015 throughout the world.  
Tournaments include international (FIBA), professional (club) and amateur and collegiate levels.

National team tournaments

Summer Olympics qualifying

Teams that qualified to the Olympics are boldfaced.

Men
AfroBasket 2015 at Tunisia:
 
 
 
2015 FIBA Americas Championship at Mexico:
 
 
 
2015 FIBA Asia Championship at China:
 
 
 
EuroBasket 2015 at France, Croatia, Latvia and Germany:
 
 
 
2015 FIBA Oceania Championship at Australia and New Zealand:

Women
AfroBasket Women 2015 at Cameroon:
 
 
 
2015 FIBA Americas Women's Championship at Canada:
 
 
 
2015 FIBA Asia Women's Championship at China:
 
 
 
EuroBasket Women 2015 at Hungary and Romania:
 
 
 
2015 FIBA Oceania Women's Championship at Australia and New Zealand:

Basketball at multi-sport events

Men
2015 All-Africa Games in Brazzaville:
 
 
 
2015 European Games in Baku (3x3):
 
 
 
2015 Games of the Small States of Europe in Iceland:
 
 
 
2015 Island Games in Jersey:
 
 
 
2015 Pacific Games in Port Moresby:
 
 
 
2015 Pan American Games in Toronto:
 
 
 
2015 Southeast Asian Games in Singapore:
 
 
 
2015 Summer Universiade in Gwangju:

Women
2015 All-Africa Games in Brazzaville:
 
 
 
2015 European Games in Baku (3x3):
 
 
 
2015 Games of the Small States of Europe in Iceland:
 
 
 
2015 Island Games in Jersey:
 
 
 
2015 Pacific Games in Port Moresby:
 
 
 
2015 Pan American Games in Toronto:
 
 
 
2015 Southeast Asian Games in Singapore:
 
 
 
2015 Summer Universiade in Gwangju:

FIBA World Under-19 Championship

Men
2015 FIBA Under-19 World Championship in Greece:

Women
2015 FIBA Under-19 World Championship for Women in Russia:

FIBA World Under-17 Championship qualifying

Men
2015 FIBA Africa Under-16 Championship at Mali:
 
 
 
2015 FIBA Americas Under-16 Championship at Argentina:
 
 
 
2015 FIBA Asia Under-16 Championship at Indonesia:
 
 
 
2015 FIBA Europe Under-16 Championship at Lithuania:
 
 
 
2015 FIBA Oceania Under-16 Championship at New Zealand:

Women
2015 FIBA Africa Under-16 Championship for Women at Madagascar:
 
 
 
2015 FIBA Americas Under-16 Championship for Women at Mexico:
 
 
 
2015 FIBA Asia Under-16 Championship for Women at Indonesia:
 
 
 
2015 FIBA Europe Under-16 Championship for Women at Macedonia:
 
 
 
2015 FIBA Oceania Under-16 Championship for Women at New Zealand:

Professional club seasons

FIBA Intercontinental Cup

Continental seasons

Regional seasons

Men

Women

Domestic league seasons

Men

Women

College seasons

Men

Women

Notable events
 January 25 – Duke coach Mike Krzyzewski becomes the first NCAA Division I men's coach with 1,000 career wins, following the Blue Devils' 77–68 win over St. John's at Madison Square Garden.
 February 3
 Connecticut women's coach Geno Auriemma becomes the fastest coach to 900 wins in college basketball history at any level, following the Huskies' 96–36 home blowout of Cincinnati. Auriemma reached 900 wins in 1,034 games; the previous record was 1,072 by Pat Summitt, while the record in men's basketball is 1,183 games by Krzyzewski. Auriemma also becomes the first man ever to reach the 900-win mark in NCAA women's basketball; the previous six coaches to do so are all women.
 WNBA star Diana Taurasi announces that she will sit out the 2015 season at the behest of her Russian club, UMMC Ekaterinburg. The club, which already has her under contract for about US$1.5 million a season, is reportedly paying her more than the WNBA maximum salary of $107,000 as a bonus to skip the WNBA season.
 February 7 – Herb Magee, coach at NCAA Division II Philadelphia University since 1967, becomes the second NCAA men's coach with 1,000 career wins following the Rams' 80–60 win over Post.

Awards and honors

Naismith Memorial Basketball Hall of Fame
 Players: Louie Dampier, Spencer Haywood, John Isaacs, Lisa Leslie, Dikembe Mutombo, Jo Jo White 
 Coaches: John Calipari, Lindsay Gaze, Tom Heinsohn
 Referees: Dick Bavetta
 Contributors: George Raveling

Women's Basketball Hall of Fame
Lisa Leslie
Janeth Arcain
Janet Harris
Gail Goestenkors (coach)
Brad Smith  (coach)
Kurt Budke (coach)

FIBA Hall of Fame
 Players: Anne Donovan, Michael Jordan, Ruperto Herrera Tabio, Šarūnas Marčiulionis, Antoine Rigaudeau, Vladimir Tkachenko
 Coaches: Jan Stirling
 Officials: Robert Blanchard
 Contributors: Noah Klieger

Deaths
January 4 — Jack Parr, American NBA player (Cincinnati Royals) (born 1936)
January 4 — Stuart Scott, American NBA television studio host (born 1965)
January 9 — Ah Chew Goo, American college coach (Hawaii) (born 1918)
January 9 — Roy Tarpley, American NBA player (Dallas Mavericks) (born 1964)
January 14 — Bob Boyd, American college coach (Seattle, USC, Mississippi State) (born 1930)
January 16 — Ray Lumpp, American NBA player (New York Knicks) and Olympic champion (born 1923)
January 17 — Roderick McDonald, American ABA player (Utah Stars) (born 1945)
January 18 — Milt Schoon, American NBL player (Sheboygan Red Skins) (born 1922)
January 27 — Bob Shea, American BAA player (Providence Steamrollers) (born 1924)
January 30 — Carl Boldt, American college player (San Francisco) who won an NCAA national championship in 1955–56 (born 1932)
January 30 — Ben Schadler, American BAA/NBL player (born 1924)
February 1 — Ron Johnson, American NBA player (Detroit Pistons, Los Angeles Lakers) (born 1938)
February 5 — Don Suman, American college coach (Rice) (born 1920)
February 6 — Norm Drucker, American NBA and ABA official (born 1920)
February 7 — Dean Smith, American Hall of Fame college coach (North Carolina) (born 1931)
February 9 — Ken Cunningham, American college coach (Akron) (born 1943)
February 10 — Wayne Dobbs, American college coach (Belmont, Vanderbilt) (born 1939)
February 11 — Jerry Tarkanian, American Hall of Fame college and NBA coach (Long Beach State, UNLV, San Antonio Spurs, Fresno State) (born 1930)
February 15 — Terry Truax, American college coach (Towson) (born 1945)
February 18 — Jerome Kersey, American NBA player (Portland Trail Blazers and others) (born 1962)
February 20 — Dick Triptow, American NBA player (born 1922)
February 26 — Earl Lloyd, American NBA player and coach, first African-American to play in the NBA, Hall of Fame member as a contributor (born 1928)
February 28 — Anthony Mason, American NBA player (born 1966)
March 1 — Guram Minashvili, Georgian Olympic silver medalist (1960) (born 1935)
March 1 — Chris Welp, German NBA and Euroleague player (born 1964)
March 4 — Stacey Arceneaux, American NBA player (St. Louis Hawks) (born 1936)
March 6 — Enrique "Coco" Vicéns, Puerto Rican player (born 1926)
March 16 — Chet Giermak, All-American college player (William & Mary) (born 1928)
March 16 — Jack Haley, American NBA player (born 1964)
March 21 — Warren Womble, American AAU and Olympic coach (1952) (born 1920)
March 23 — Bobby Lowther, American NBL player (Tri-Cities Blackhawks, Waterloo Hawks) (born 1923)
March 25 — Loy Young, American college coach (Chadron State) (born 1923)
March 27 — Hot Rod Hundley, American NBA player (Los Angeles Lakers) and announcer (born 1934)
April 7 — Torrey Ward, American player and coach (born 1978)
April 10 — Lauren Hill, American college basketball player and pediatric cancer advocate who died of brain cancer during her freshman season at Mount St. Joseph (born 1995)
April 11 — Charlie Beasley, American ABA player (Dallas Chaparrals, Miami Floridians) (born 1945)
April 13 — Gerald Calabrese, American NBA player (Syracuse Nationals) (born 1925)
April 25 — Mike Phillips, American Liga ACB player (FC Barcelona) and college national champion (1978 Kentucky) (born 1956)
May 10 — Davey Whitney, American Hall of Fame college coach (Texas Southern, Alcorn State) (born 1930)
May 11 — Bob Light, American college coach (Appalachian State) (born 1927)
May 12 — Bill Guthridge, American college coach (North Carolina) (born 1937)
May 15 — Bob Hopkins, American NBA player (Syracuse Nationals) and coach (Seattle SuperSonics) (born 1934)
May 22 — Marques Haynes, American Hall of Fame Harlem Globetrotters player (born 1926)
May 23 — Boody Gilbertson, American NBL player (Sheboygan Red Skins) (born 1922)
May 23 — Andres Ortiz, Puerto Rican player (Indios de Mayagüez)
May 26 — Walter Byers, Executive Director of the NCAA, College Basketball Hall of Fame inductee (born 1922)
May 27 — Vittorio Paolo Fiorito, Italian referee (born 1941)
May 27 — Bill Foster, American college coach (Miami, Virginia Tech, Clemson) (born 1936)
June 3 — Bevo Francis, American college player (Rio Grande College) (born 1932)
June 14 — Bob Bedell, American ABA player (Anaheim Amigos, Dallas Chaparrals) (born 1944)
June 23 — Harvey Pollack, Director of Statistical Information for the Philadelphia 76ers (born 1922)
June 29 — Jackson Vroman, American-born Lebanese NBA player (Phoenix Suns, New Orleans Hornets) (born 1981)
July 20 — George Bon Salle, American NBA player (Chicago Packers) (born 1935)
July 25 — Bob Kauffman, American NBA player (born 1946)
July 30 — John Weinert, American college coach (Bowling Green) (born 1931)
August 3 — Frank Kerns, American college coach (Georgia Southern) (born 1933)
August 4 — John Rudometkin, American NBA player (New York Knicks, San Francisco Warriors) (born 1940)
August 10 — Cleo Hill, American NBA player (St. Louis Hawks) (born 1938)
August 22 — Lou Tsioropoulos, American NBA player (Boston Celtics) (born 1930)
August 24 — Bevo Nordmann, American NBA player (Cincinnati Royals, St. Louis Hawks, New York Knicks) (born 1939)
August 27 — Darryl Dawkins, American NBA player (Philadelphia 76ers, New Jersey Nets) (born 1957)
September 11 — Roy Marble, American NBA player (Atlanta Hawks, Denver Nuggets) (born 1966)
September 13 — Moses Malone, American Hall of Fame ABA and NBA player (born 1955)
September 21 — Ivan Dvorny, Russian/Soviet Olympic Gold medalist (1972) (born 1952)
September 25 — Bill Bridges, American NBA player (Atlanta Hawks, Golden State Warriors) (born 1939)
September 25 — Tommie Green, American NBA player (New Orleans Jazz) and college coach (Southern) (born 1956)
October 4 — Neal Walk, American NBA player (Phoenix Suns, New Orleans Jazz, New York Knicks) (born 1948)
October 7 — Harry Gallatin, American Hall of Fame NBA player and coach (born 1927)
October 9 — Dave Meyers, American NBA player (Milwaukee Bucks) and college All-American (UCLA) (born 1953)
October 15 — Nate Huffman, American NBA (Toronto Raptors) and Euroleague (Maccabi Tel Aviv) player (born 1975)
October 18 — Tommy O'Keefe, American NBA player (Washington Capitols, Baltimore Bullets) (born 1928)
October 19 — D. C. Wilcutt, American NBA player (St. Louis Bombers) (born 1923)
October 20 — Makis Dendrinos, Greek player (Panionios) and coach (born 1950)
October 25 — Flip Saunders, American NBA coach (Minnesota Timberwolves, Detroit Pistons, Washington Wizards) (born 1955)
October 26 — Zeke Hogeland, American college coach (Bemidji State, Northern Iowa) (born 1925)
October 29 — Luther Burden, American ABA and NBA player (Virginia Squires, New York Knicks) (born 1953)
October 29 — Boris Kristančič, Slovenian/Yugoslav Olympic player (born 1932)
October 29 — Ranko Žeravica, Serbian coach (Partizan) (born 1929)
October 30 — Mel Daniels, American Hall of Fame ABA player (Indiana Pacers) (born 1944)
November 10 — Michael Wright, American-born Turkish player (born 1980)
November 11 — Scotty Stirling, American ABA and NBA executive
November 14 — Norm Ellenberger, American college coach (New Mexico)
November 26 — Guy Lewis, American Hall of Fame college coach (Houston Cougars) (born 1922)
November 26 — Bill Stauffer, American college player (Missouri Tigers) (born 1930)
December 1 — Jim Loscutoff, American NBA player (Boston Celtics) (born 1930)
December 5 — Dave Scholz, American NBA player (Philadelphia 76ers) (born 1948)
December 10 — Dolph Schayes, American Hall of Fame NBA player (Syracuse Nationals) (born 1928)
December 11 — John "Hot Rod" Williams, American NBA player (Cleveland Cavaliers, Phoenix Suns, Dallas Mavericks) (born 1962)
December 16 — John Bates, American college coach (Maryland Eastern Shore, Coppin State) (born 1938)
December 21 — Lim Eng Beng, Filipino basketball player (born 1951)
December 23 — Chen Luyun, Chinese basketball player (born 1977)
December 24 — Ron Jacobs, American college (Loyola Marymount) and professional (Northern Cement) coach (born 1942)
December 26 — Mac Otten, American NBA player (Tri-Cities Blackhawks, St. Louis Bombers) (born 1925)
December 27 — Meadowlark Lemon, American Hall of Fame player (Harlem Globetrotters) (born 1932)
December 28 — Dave Campbell, Canadian Olympic player (1948) (born 1925)

See also
 Timeline of women's basketball

References